Gmina Dubienka is a rural gmina (administrative district) in Chełm County, Lublin Voivodeship, in eastern Poland, on the border with Ukraine.

The gmina contains part of the protected area called Strzelce Landscape Park.

Villages
Gmina Dubienka contains the villages and settlements of Brzozowiec, Dubienka, Holendry, Janostrów, Jasienica, Józefów, Kajetanówka, Krynica, Lipniki, Mateuszowo, Nowokajetanówka, Radziejów, Rogatka, Siedliszcze, Skryhiczyn, Stanisławówka, Starosiele, Tuchanie, Uchańka, and Zagórnik.

Neighbouring gminas
Gmina Dubienka is bordered by the gminas of Białopole, Dorohusk, Horodło and Żmudź. It also borders Ukraine.

References
 Polish official population figures 2006

Dubienka
Chełm County